Zagrebelny (Zahrebelny, Zahrebelnyi, Zagrebelnyi) is a Ukrainian surname. Notable people with the surname include:

 Pavlo Zahrebelnyi (1924–2009) Ukrainian writer
 Sergey Zagrebelny (born 1965), Uzbekistani chess Grandmaster
 Vladyslav Zahrebelnyi (born 1991), Ukrainian Paralympic athlete

Ukrainian-language surnames